This is a comprehensive discography of official recordings by Vertical Horizon, an American alternative band originally from Washington, D.C.

Albums

Studio albums

Live albums

Singles

References

Discography
Discographies of American artists
Rock music group discographies